"4:44" is a song by American hip hop artist Jay-Z, released as the lead single from his thirteenth studio album of the same name. It was written by Jay-Z and its producer No I.D. The song contains a sample of "Late Nights and Heartbreak", written by Kanan Keeney—who is credited as a songwriter—and performed by Hannah Williams and The Affirmations, along with an uncredited interpolation from "(At Your Best) You Are Love" by the Isley Brothers. Following the release of the album, the song charted in Belgium, Canada, France, the United Kingdom, and the United States. It received nominations for Song of the Year and Best Rap Performance at the 60th Annual Grammy Awards. The title of the song is the same as the song's length.

Personnel 
 Kim Burrell – additional vocals
 James Fauntleroy – Kim Burrell vocal production
 Gimel "Young Guru" Keaton – recording
 Jimmy Douglass – mixing
 Dave Kutch – mastering

Charts

Awards

Release history

References 

2017 songs
Jay-Z songs
Songs written by Jay-Z
Songs written by No I.D.
Song recordings produced by No I.D.